Los Creadorez is a Regional Mexican band based in Chicago, Illinois, United States, and led by Alfredo Ramírez Corral.

History
In 2006, alongside co-founder Ismael Mijarez, Corral put together one of the first stateside Duranguense bands, and achieved great success. Los Creadorez del Pasito Duranguense was created when Corral and Mijares left Montéz de Durango, taking most of its members and only leaving the Terrazas family in the band.  DISA Latin Music released two singles, "Que Levante La Mano" and "Cada Vez Que Pienso En Ti", both of which made appearances on the Billboard Regional Mexican charts. Los Creadorez interpreted their decade of success and fans' acceptance of their new package as a sign of Duranguense’s staying power. As the genre rounded its first ten years, sales increased and interest arose far outside the city of Chicago, and Duranguense artists looked to the veterans for direction. Corral and Mijarez – having been around as long as anyone – found themselves in the position of being trend-setters. Los Creadorez's first record, Recio, Recio Mis Creadorez, was released in late January 2007.

On February 23, 2007, they won the Best New Artist award at Premios Lo Nuestro and also performed at the Billboard Music Awards of 2007. They were nominees for Regional Mexican Airplay Track of the Year for "Que Lastima". They performed in several sell-out arenas and stadiums in United States. On a signing meeting, they congregated eight thousand people. In November 2008, they were nominated for a Latin Grammy for their album, "Listos, Montados, Y Armados".

In 2013, they shortened the name to Los Creadorez and changed to the Norteño-Banda style. Shortly thereafter, they changed their style to Norteño-Sax.

Band members
Alfredo Ramírez Corral – lead vocals and keyboards
Ismael Mijares Bustamante – bass guitar and co-ordination
Armando Aguirre  – tambora and percussion
Agustín Fregoso Delgado – backing vocal
Domingo César Ruelas Llamas – trombone and saxophone
Francisco López López – keyboards, sound of Harmonica N364 and tenor saxophone and Pan flute
Miguel Ángel Lara Gómez – drums
José Saúl Lara Gómez – trombone and saxophone

Discography
 2006: Libres
 2007: Recio, Recio Mis Creadorez
 2007: Corridos, Rancheras Y Más...
 2008: Listos, Montados Y Armados
 2009: En Vivo Desde Durango
 2009: Avanzando En La Vida
 2010: Puras De Jose Alfredo
 2013: Tercia De Ases
 2013: En Vivo Homenaje A Jose Alfredo Jimenez
 2013: A Todisima Banda
 2014: Norteño Rancho
 2016: Seguimos De Pie
 2018: Solo Deje Yo A Mi Padre
 2020: No Quiero Limosna

References

External links
Los Creadorez official web site

Musical groups from Chicago
American duranguense musicians
Duranguense music groups